MacGreevy is a surname. Notable people with the surname include:

 Oliver MacGreevy (1928–1981), Irish actor
 Thomas MacGreevy (1893–1967), Irish poet

See also
 McGreevy
 McGreevey